Himachal Pradesh University (HPU) is an Indian public state university at Summer Hill in the state capital city Shimla. It is close to the vicinity of the Indian Institute of Advanced Study. It is wholly financed by the government of Himachal Pradesh and the University Grants Commission, New Delhi.

History 

Himachal Pradesh University was established on 22 July 1970 by an Act of the Himachal Pradesh Legislative Assembly. The faculty of law of the university came into existence on the same date, whereas other departments were created in subsequent years. Other colleges are affiliated to the university such as Govt. College Sanjauli, St. Bede's College, RKMV College, and Rajiv Gandhi Degree College.

The University has a total of 13 faculties, 11 of which comprise 52 departments and 5 centres and institutes, which run 132 academic programmes. These programmes are also offered by the colleges and institutes affiliated to the University.

Institutes and centres
Himachal Pradesh University Business School
University Institute of Information Technology, Shimla

General degree Colleges under Himachal Pradesh University
 Government College Sanjauli, Shimla
 Rajiv Gandhi Government Degree College, Shimla
 Rajkiya Kanya Maha Vidyalaya, Shimla
 St. Bede's College, Shimla
 Government College Solan
 B.B.N. Degree College Chakmoh HP Hamirpur
 Government College Chamba
 Government College, Karsog
 Government College, Dharamshala
 GB Pant Memorial Govt Degree College, Rampur Bushahr
 Government Degree College, Kumarsain
 Government College of Teachers Education Dharamshala
 Government College, Barsar
 Government College Hamirpur

Notable alumni

Hamid Karzai, former President of Afghanistan, MA in International Relations & Political Science (1983), Doctor of Literature (honorary, 2003)
 J P Nadda, National President of Bharatiya Janata Party and former Union Minister of Health and Family Welfare, LL.B from Faculty of Law, Himachal Pradesh University
 Anand Sharma, Former Union Minister of Commerce and Industry, Government of India, LL.B from Faculty of Law, Himachal Pradesh University
 Anupam Kher, Indian actor, drop-out of Government College, Sanjauli
Mohit Chauhan, Popular Indian singer, M.Sc in Geology from Government College, Dharamshala
Ashwani Kumar, Former Governor of Nagaland
Randeep Guleria, Director of AIIMS, New Delhi, MBBS from Indira Gandhi Medical College
 Sanjay Karol, Chief Justice of Tripura High Court, LL.B from Faculty of Law, Himachal Pradesh University
Suresh Kumar Kashyap, Current State President of BJP
 Indu Goswami, Member of Parliament, Rajya Sabha
Rajeev Sharma, Former Judge of Punjab and Haryana High Court, LL.B from Faculty of Law, Himachal Pradesh University
Abhilasha Kumari, Judicial Member of Lokpal Committee, Faculty of Law, Himachal Pradesh University
Vijay Sharma, famous painter and a Padam Shri awardee
Arzu Rana Deuba, Member of Nepali Congress Party
Tsering Dhondup, Minister of Finance in Central Tibetan Administration
Singhi Ram, Former Union Minister of Food and Supplies, LLB from Faculty of Law, Himachal Pradesh University
Ram Lal Thakur, Former Union Youth Services and Sports Minister of LLB from Faculty of Law, Himachal Pradesh University
Shazia Ilmi, Current Spokesperson of BJP, Graduated from St. Bedes College
Lakhvinder Singh Rana, MLA, Himachal Pradesh Legislative Assembly
Rajinder Garg, MLA, Himachal Pradesh Legislative Assembly

References

External links
 Official website

 
Education in Himachal Pradesh
Education in Shimla
Educational institutions established in 1970